Drugs controlled by the German Betäubungsmittelgesetz (BtMG). Trade and possession of these substances without licence or prescription is considered illegal; prescription is illegal for drugs on Anlage I and II and drugs on Anlage III require a special prescription form.

Anlage I
Anlage I controlled substances are non-tradable. Those substances are available only by special permission of the authorities, which is granted only for scientific or other public interest purposes.

As well as ester, ether, stereoisomers and salts of the substances listed in Anlage I.

Anlage II
Anlage II controlled substances are tradable, given special permission of the authorities, however not prescriptible. Narcotics on Anlage II are usually needed for the production of other narcotics on Anlage III.

As well as ester, ether and salts of the substances listed in Anlage II.

Anlage III
Anlage III controlled substances are tradable and prescriptible, but only on a special prescription form. The prescription must be necessary in that its purpose cannot be met by other means.  Summary of Product Characteristics for those substances are restricted to professional circles.

As well as salts of the substances listed in Anlage III.

See also
 Betäubungsmittelgesetz
 Drug policy of Germany

References

German criminal law
Drug policy of Germany
Pharmaceuticals policy
Betäubungsmittelgesetz
Drug-related lists
Regulation in Germany